Wadie is a given name. Notable people with the name include:

 Wadie P. Deddeh (born 1920), American politician from California
 Wadie Haddad (1927–1978), Palestinian leader of the Popular Front for the Liberation of Palestine's armed wing
 Wadie Jwaideh (1916–2001), Iraqi-American professor of history and author